Mega TV may refer to:

Mega TV (American TV network), a Spanish television network based in Florida
MegaTV (Korea), a Korean IPTV service
Mega Channel, a Greek television station
Mega TV (Malaysia), a now defunct Malaysian cable television station
Mega TV (Tamil), a Tamil language television channel from India

See also 
Red Televisiva Megavisión, a Chilean television station
Other Mega television channels